The Reformed Church is a church in Tăşnad, Romania, established in 1476.

History
The Church was first consecrated in 1476. Originally a Roman Catholic church, it changed hands to the Reformed tradition in the 16th century. It was damaged by fire in 1660 and rebuilt temporarily in wood, then in the 18th century rebuilt in masonry with the tower and spire finally being completed in 1822.

References

Tășnad
Reformed churches in Romania
Historic monuments in Satu Mare County
Churches completed in 1476